is a Japanese manga series by Jun Hanyunyū. It was adapted into a live action film in 2004.

Cast
 Ryuhei Matsuda - Mon Aoki
 Wakana Sakai - Koino Akashi
 Suzuki Matsuo - Marimoda
 Kiyoshirô Imawano
 Hijiri Kojima - Mejina
 Shinya Tsukamoto - Noro
 Hideaki Anno
 Moyoco Anno

References

External links
 

1998 manga
2004 films
Live-action films based on manga
Films directed by Suzuki Matsuo
Manga adapted into films
Seinen manga
Enterbrain manga
Kadokawa Dwango franchises
2000s Japanese films